Lynn D. Stewart (born 1941)  is an American politician and a former Republican member of the Nevada Assembly from February 2006 to 2016, representing District 22 in Clark County.
2015 Session.  Lynn Stewart was Chairman of the Legislative Operations and Elections Committee.  His vote in favor of the controversial Governor's Budget (which included a "Margin Tax")was not the cause of his not running for reelection. He did not run for reelection in 2016 because of poor eyesight caused by Macular Degeneration.

References

Living people
1941 births
Republican Party members of the Nevada Assembly
21st-century American politicians
People from Salt Lake City
Politicians from Las Vegas